Rolando Marciano Bogado Vázquez (born 22 April 1984) is a Paraguayan former professional footballer who played as a defender.

Honours
 Peruvian Primera División Best Defender: 2013

References
 
 

1984 births
Living people
People from Villarrica, Paraguay
Paraguayan footballers
Association football defenders
Independiente F.B.C. footballers
Club Libertad footballers
Club Nacional footballers
Club Rubio Ñu footballers
Godoy Cruz Antonio Tomba footballers
Cobresal footballers
Sportivo Luqueño players
Chilean Primera División players
Peruvian Primera División players
Paraguayan expatriate footballers
Paraguayan expatriate sportspeople in Argentina
Expatriate footballers in Argentina
Paraguayan expatriate sportspeople in Chile
Expatriate footballers in Chile
Paraguayan expatriate sportspeople in Mexico
Expatriate footballers in Mexico
Paraguayan expatriate sportspeople in Peru
Expatriate footballers in Peru